Ayele Mekonnen (born 12 December 1957) is an Ethiopian former cyclist. He competed in the team time trial event at the 1980 Summer Olympics.

References

External links
 

1957 births
Living people
Ethiopian male cyclists
Olympic cyclists of Ethiopia
Cyclists at the 1980 Summer Olympics
Place of birth missing (living people)